Skyline Whispers is the second studio album by Swedish classic rock/AOR band The Night Flight Orchestra, released on 9 June 2015 via Coroner Records.

Track listing

Credits

Personnel 
The Night Flight Orchestra
 Björn "Speed" Strid – vocals
 David Andersson – guitar
 Sharlee D'Angelo – bass
 Richard Larsson – keyboards
 Jonas Källsbäck – drums
 Sebastian Forslund – congas, percussion, guitar
Production
 Bengan Andersson – engineering
 Sebastian Forslund – mixing
 Thomas "PLEC" Johansson – mastering
Notes
 Recorded at Nordic Sound Lab Studios in Skara, Sweden.
 Mastered at Panic Room Studios in Skara, Sweden.

References 

2015 albums
The Night Flight Orchestra albums